Chernihiv River Port is a port enterprise on the Desna River. It is located in the regional center of Chernihiv Oblast, in Chernihiv, Ukraine. It has the status of OJSC.

See also
Siege of Chernihiv
Cargo turnover of Ukrainian ports

Gallery

References

River ports of Ukraine
Transport in Ukraine by city